Mehdi Zana (born 20 December 1940, Silvan) is an author and former Kurdish politician from Turkey. He is prominent Kurdish political activist a former Mayor of Diyarbakır. Following the coup de état in 1980 he was imprisoned for more than ten years.

Early life and education
Zana went to the local elementary school and did not finish high school to begin to work as a tailor in Silvan. The workshop he worked in was owned by a prominent Kurdist intellectual of the time, Niyazi Tatlıcı. The tailor workshop has been described as a sort of a "university" by political activists of the time. In the Eastern Meetings (Doğu mitingleri) he attempted to organize a Kurdish theater tour through four villages in Diyarbakir but didn't succeed. Besides he was also involved in the Revolutionary Cultural Eastern Hearths (DDKO).

Political career 
In 1963 he became a member of Workers Party of Turkey (TİP) of which two years later he became the head of the Silvan branch. While in Silvan, he supported the establishment of a theater company with the aim to draw interest on socialism and the Kurdishness. In the parliamentary election of 1969 the TIP, unsuccessfully put him forward as candidate for Diyarbakir. He was straight forward and urged the people to acknowledge their Kurdishness and changed his Turkish given name Bilici into the Kurdish equivalent. Due to his activism, he was detained for a year in the late 1960s and again between 1971 and 1974. He also undertook journeys towards Syria and Iran, during which he attempted to extend his Kurdish political network.  In August 1977, he made his candidacy to the mayorship of Diyarbakir known to the public. During the electoral campaign he often held speeches in Kurdish, and focused on a Kurdish "we" and a Turkish "they". He rallied for the support of the Kurdish tribes, of which the tribes of the  Omeyran and the Botan also supported him. In the local elections of December 1977 he was elected as the first independent socialist mayor of Diyarbakır. He won against the candidate supported by the TIP and the pro-Kurdish DDKO, Yahya Mehmetoğlu. After the 1980 Turkish coup d'état he was imprisoned until April 1991. After his release he went to France for medical treatment until February 1992. He was imprisoned again between 1994 and 1995.

Political views 
As mayor he engaged with other Kurds in the aim to foment a transnational aid network. He encouraged the use of Kurdish language in the city council and the municipality. He encouraged the use of Kurdish language in the city council and the municipality. He undertook various trips to Sweden, France and Germany and in 1979 several socialist-run cities in France sent fifteen trucks and buses to Diyarbakir as gift. As was a member of the DDKO, and a constant defender of Kurdish rights and acknowledged the Kurdish role in the Armenian genocide.

Personal life 
Mehdi Zana has been married to politician Leyla Zana since 1975 and the couple has two children. He was imprisoned for 16 years during his life. After his release in 1995, he went to receive the Sakharov Prize in 1996 on behalf of his imprisoned wife, Leyla Zana. Following his release, has lived for several years in exile in Europe where he lived in Sweden and Germany. Mehdi changed his name from the Turkish Bilici into the Kurdish equivalent Zana.

Bibliography

References

External links
 Congressman Bob Filner discusses Leyla and Mehdi Zana.

1940 births
Living people
Turkish Kurdish people
Kurdish activists
Turkish Kurdish politicians
Mayors of Diyarbakır
Turkish emigrants to Sweden
Turkish human rights activists
Turkish prisoners and detainees
Workers' Party of Turkey politicians
Politicians arrested in Turkey
Kurdish politicians
People expelled from public office
Kurdish writers